Shivkar Bāpuji Talpade (1864 – 1916) was an Indian instructor in the Sir JJ School of Art with an interest in Sanskrit and in aviation. He lived in Mumbai, and is claimed to have constructed and flown an unmanned, heavier-than-air aircraft in 1895. Contemporary accounts of a successful flight do not exist, and no reliable historical records document its existence.

Biography 
Talpade was born in South Bombay (present-day Mumbai), in a Pathare Prabhu family. The year of his birth has been reported as 1864. Talpade worked as a technical instructor in the art and craft department of Sir JJ School of Art. He was a member of the Arya Samaj. According to Prathap Velkar, an author who studied Talpade, he had an interest in studying Sanskrit. Talpade had one son, who remained childless; Talpade therefore left no direct descendants.

Talpade's aircraft 
Talpade is reputed to have constructed an unmanned, heavier-than-air aircraft, named Marutsakhā, and flown it above Bombay's Chowpatty Beach in 1895. Contemporary accounts of a successful flight do not exist, and no reliable historical records document its existence. 

The aircraft has been described as a cylinder of bamboo, with claims it used mercury or urine as a fuel. Some of Talpade's drawings were said to have been sent to Hindustan Aeronautics (HAL), but Anuradha Reddy, a historian of aviation, was unable to trace them. The aircraft itself has been described as being sold to Rallis Brothers, or to HAL. Some accounts of the event stated that the flight was watched by Sayajirao Gaekwad III, then the Maharaja of Baroda, but direct evidence for this is scant. Velkar states that no royals attended, as it was not well-publicized.

The aircraft was purportedly inspired by the Vaimānika Shāstra ("Science of Aeronautics"), a text authored in 1904 that is frequently associated with descriptions of aircraft in the Vedas. The technological feasibility of the designs in the Vaimānika Shāstra was debunked in a 1974 paper by scientists from the Indian Institute of Science. The Vaimānika Shāstra itself states that Talpade was unsuccessful in his attempt to construct an aircraft.

Cultural legacy
Narratives about the event proliferated in the early 2000s among adherents of the nationalist right-wing. The absence of evidence of its construction is attributed to censorship by the British Raj. Talpade developed a reputation as the "first man to fly an aircraft", given that his achievement was supposed to have taken place eight years before the Wright Brothers flew their plane in 1903. Talpade's aircraft was unmanned: unmanned aircraft were already in existence at that time, and were flown successfully decades before Talpade's birth. The first such flight was by English engineer John Stringfellow, whose craft flew about thirty yards in 1848.   

A film based on life of Talpade, Hawaizaada, starring Ayushmann Khurrana, was released on 30 January 2015. The government of Uttar Pradesh exempt the film from taxes in that state. The film states that Talpade had accomplished in 1895 what the Wright Brothers did in 1903. The Hindi News channel Zee News aired a piece titled "Wright brothers wrong " (the Wright brothers were wrong.) The segment claimed that Talpade's craft was the first modern aircraft in the world, and that it was the first drone. Also in 2015, a controversial paper presented at the Indian Science Congress claimed that Talpade had "invented the modern aircraft". Ram Prasad Gandhiraman, a scientist working for NASA, described the paper as pseudoscience.

References

1864 births
1916 deaths
Aviation pioneers
Marathi people